The 2021 Florida Atlantic Owls baseball team represented Florida Atlantic University in the sport of baseball for the 2021 college baseball season. The Owls competed in Division I of the National Collegiate Athletic Association (NCAA) and the Conference USA.  They played their home games at FAU Baseball Stadium, on the university's Boca Raton campus.  The team was coached by John McCormack, who was in his thirteenth season at Florida Atlantic.

Previous season

The 2020 Owls finished 10–6 overall. This season was cancelled due to the COVID-19 pandemic.

Preseason

C-USA media poll
The Conference USA preseason poll was released on February 11, 2021 with the Owls predicted to finish in first place in the East Division.

Preseason All-CUSA teams
Bobby Morgensen – Outfielder
Mitchell Hartigan – Designated Hitter/Utility Player

Personal

Roster

Coaching staff

Schedule and results

Schedule Source:
*Rankings are based on the team's current ranking in the D1Baseball poll.

Rankings

Awards

References

External links
•	FAU Baseball

Florida Atlantic
Florida Atlantic Owls baseball seasons
Florida Atlantic Owls baseball